For the Sake of Revenge is a live album and DVD recorded by the Finnish power metal band Sonata Arctica. It was recorded at Shibuya AX, Tokyo, Japan on 5 February 2005. Along with the CD there is a DVD in stereo and Surround 5.1 sound, which also includes Finnish commentary track by the band, Misplaced Cameras On Tour, a biography, discography and some photos.

CD track listing

DVD track listing

 There is also a biography, discography and a bonus feature called "The Men of the North in the Land of the Rising Sun" in the extras section.

Personnel
Tony Kakko – vocals
Jani Liimatainen – guitar, backing vocals
Marko Paasikoski – bass guitar, backing vocals
Henrik Klingenberg – keyboards, keytar, backing vocals
Tommy Portimo – drums

Charts

Certifications

Info
Recorded at Shibuya AX, Tokyo, Japan on 5 February 2005
Mixed by Pasi Kauppinen at Studio57
Mastered by Svante Forsbäck at Chartmakers
Artwork by Gina "Ravnheart" Pitkänen

Notes 

- On "Black Sheep", Tony Kakko sings different lyrics after the intro. Instead of singing "In love with the maiden, the flower of winter, lowbrow children, in grove of the inland", Tony sings "We love Iron Maiden, but we're not from England, we are Sonata, and we come from Finland." After this, however, Tony sings the lyrics as heard on the Silence album.

- In the middle of "Kingdom for a Heart" they play few lines from "Letter to Dana".

- In the song "Shamandalie", Tony Kakko also changes the line "Time went by" to "Years went by".

- In "Full Moon", Tony changes the lyrics from "Sitting in a corner all alone" to "Standing in a corner all alone", and, at the end of the second verse changes "Mess on the floor again" to "Makes him insane to know".

Credits
All songs written by T. Kakko, except "Prelude For Reckoning" by Jani Liimatainen
Arrangements by Sonata Arctica

References

Sonata Arctica albums
2006 live albums
Live video albums
2006 video albums
Nuclear Blast live albums
Nuclear Blast video albums